Hökməli (also, Gekmaly and Geokmaly) is a village and municipality in the Absheron Rayon of Azerbaijan.  It has a population of 4,463.

References 

Populated places in Absheron District